The following outline is provided as an overview of and topical guide to water:

Water is a chemical substance with the chemical formula H2O. A water molecule contains one oxygen and two hydrogen atoms connected by covalent bonds. Water is a liquid at ambient conditions, but it often co-exists on Earth with its solid state, ice, and gaseous state (water vapor or steam). Under nomenclature used to name chemical compounds, Dihydrogen monoxide is the scientific name for water, though it is almost never used.

History
 The identification of water as a substance

Chemical properties and use

Physical properties

Geography

Weather

 
 
 
 
 
 
 
 
 
 
 
 
 
 
 
 s

In nature and life

Marine and aquatic life

Politics and issues

Supply and sanitation

In culture and sport

Uses

Fishing

See also
Hydrological Ensemble Prediction Experiment

References

External links

OECD Water statistics
The World's Water Data Page
FAO Comprehensive Water Database, AQUASTAT
The Water Conflict Chronology: Water Conflict Database
US Geological Survey Water for Schools information
Portal to The World Bank's strategy, work and associated publications on water resources
America Water Resources Association 
America Water Resources Association 
Water structure and science

 1
Water
Water